Prince Józef Aleksander Lubomirski (1751–1817) was a Polish noble (szlachcic) and a magnate. 
He was Lieutenant General of the Polish Army, castellan of Kiev and Starost of  Romanów (1774–1817)

Son of Stanisław Lubomirski, Voivode of the Kiev Voivodeship and the Bratslav Voivodeship, brother of Michał Lubomirski, Lieutenant General of the Polish Army himself too, heir of Równe and its dependences.

Married to Ludwika Sosnowska, once loved by Tadeusz Kościuszko.

From 1774, he is Starost of  Romanów (1774–1817) and armored regiment commander. Between 1786 and 1788,  Head of the 12th Royal Regiment of Infantry, later the 5th Royal Regiment  of Infantry. Lieutenant General from 1792.

He supported the "Constitution of May 3, 1791", but hadn't fought for its defense, saying he was sick in August  He remained in service at Targowica at the time, assigned to the 4th Division de Kamieniec Podolski. But soon retrograded due to lack of knowledge of the service line.

From 1790 to 1795, he was Castellan of Kiev.

He was one of the richest Polish magnates and pioneer of the country's industrialization. He assumed factories such as pottery factories in Korzec. He was an active freemason.

He was: 
 Member of the Great Sejm,
 Knight of the Order of Saint Hubert, 
 Knight of the Order of Saint Stanislaus (1776), 
 Knight of the Order of the White Eagle (1791).

His son, Prince Henryk Ludwik Lubomirski (1777–1850), married Teresa Czartoryska (1785–1868), daughter of Prince Józef Klemens Czartoryski (1740–1810).

Ancestors

References  

 :pl:Józef Lubomirski

1751 births
1817 deaths
Jozef Aleksander Lubomirski 1751
Recipients of the Order of the White Eagle (Poland)
Castellans of Kiev